All the Right Noises is a 1971 British drama film directed by Gerry O'Hara and starring Tom Bell, Olivia Hussey, Judy Carne and John Standing. It is set in London.

Premise
A married man with two young children, working as a lighting technician for a theatrical company, has an affair with a 15-year-old actress.

Cast
 Tom Bell - Len Lewin
 Olivia Hussey - Val
 Judy Carne - Joy Lewin
 John Standing - Bernie
 Roy Herrick - Camera operator (uncredited)
 Yootha Joyce - Mrs Bird
 Robert Keegan - Len's father
 Lesley-Anne Down - Laura
 Marianne Stone - Landlady
 Gordon Griffin - Terry
 Edward Higgins - Ted
 Rudolph Walker - Gordon
 Oscar James - Guard
 Chloe Franks - Jenny Lewin
 Gareth Wright - Ian
 Chrissie Shrimpton - Waitress
 Peter Burton - Stage manager
 Charles Lloyd-Pack - Stagedoor keeper
 Otto Diamant - Conductor
 Nicolette Roeg - Millie
 Paul Whitsun-Jones - Mr. Melchum
 Aubrey Woods - Foreman
 Belinda Sinclair - Lottie

Home media
The BFI have released All the Right Noises on DVD and Blu-ray through its Flipside strand.

References

External links
 

1971 films
1970s coming-of-age drama films
1971 romantic drama films
British coming-of-age drama films
British romantic drama films
1970s English-language films
Films about adultery in the United Kingdom
Films directed by Gerry O'Hara
Films set in London
Juvenile sexuality in films
20th Century Fox films
Films shot in Greater Manchester
1970s British films